Steenbras Upper Dam is an earth-fill type dam located in the Hottentots Holland Mountains above Gordons Bay in the Western Cape, South Africa. It impounds the Steenbras River upstream of the older Steenbras Dam. The dam was constructed in 1977 for the City of Cape Town and serves mainly for municipal and industrial use. The hazard potential of the dam has been ranked high (3).

Steenbras Upper Dam also functions as the upper reservoir of the city's Steenbras pumped-storage hydroelectric power scheme, with a lower reservoir at the foot of the mountain. It is also linked by an open canal and pipeline to the Rockview Dam, which acts as the upper reservoir of the Palmiet Pumped Storage Scheme, a separate pumped-storage scheme operated by Eskom and the Department of Water and Sanitation. The link allows water from the Palmiet River to be transferred to the dam.

See also
 List of reservoirs and dams in South Africa
 List of rivers of South Africa

References 

 List of South African Dams from the Department of Water Affairs and Forestry (South Africa)

Dams in South Africa
Dams completed in 1977